Bohra or Bora may refer to:

Groups of people
A Musta'li trading community:
Alavi Bohra, a branch of the Mustaali community
Dawoodi Bohra, a branch of the Mustaali community
Suleimani Bohra, a Mustaali Ismaili community that predominantly reside in Saudi Arabia, Yemen, Pakistan and India
Taiyabi Dā'ĩs
Hebtiahs Bohra, a branch of the Mustaali community
 The Sunni Bohra of Gujarat

Bohora or Bohra, a Brahmin and Khas Chhetri (Kshatriya) surname found in Nepal and Uttarakhand, India
Vohra, a surname of the Khatri caste in Punjab

Individuals
Achal Das Bohra (1918–2007), Indian engineer, academician, author, educator and philanthropist
Ramkumar Bohra (1928–1991), Indian film producer, director, actor and screenwriter
Karanvir Bohra, Indian television actor

Other uses
Bohra (genus), an extinct marsupial of family Macropodidae

Indian surnames
Pakistani names
Urdu-language surnames